Gwedaukkon is a village on the Chindwin River in Homalin Township, Hkamti District, in the Sagaing Region of northwestern Burma. It is located north of Dokthida and Natset.

References

External links
Maplandia World Gazetteer

Populated places in Hkamti District
Homalin Township